Andrew David Hamilton  (born 3 November 1952) is a British American chemist and academic who is the 16th and current President of New York University. From 2009 to 2015, he served as the Vice-Chancellor of the University of Oxford. Before leading Oxford, he was Provost of Yale University from 2004 to 2008.

Early life
Andrew Hamilton was a pupil at the Royal Grammar School, Guildford. He studied chemistry at the University of Exeter, graduating with a first class Bachelor of Science (BSc) degree. After studying for a master's degree at the University of British Columbia, he received his PhD degree from St John's College, Cambridge in 1980 with a thesis titled "Models for oxygen-binding hemoproteins" under the supervision of Alan R. Battersby and then spent a post-doctoral period at the Université Louis Pasteur in Strasbourg. He received honorary doctorates from the University of Surrey, Tsinghua University, and the University of Exeter, among others.

Career
In 1981, he was appointed Assistant Professor of Chemistry at Princeton University then in 1988 as Professor of Chemistry at the University of Pittsburgh. In 1997 he moved to Yale as Benjamin Silliman Professor of Chemistry and Professor of Molecular biophysics and Biochemistry at Yale University. Hamilton's research has spanned porphyrin, supramolecular, medicinal, bioorganic chemistry and chemical biology. His laboratory is most noted for the design of barbiturate hosts, farnesyl transferase inhibitors, protein surface binders, and helix mimetics. In 2004 he was elected a Fellow of the Royal Society.

He also served as Provost of Yale University from October 2004 to October 2008 after his predecessor, Susan Hockfield, was appointed the 16th President of the Massachusetts Institute of Technology. He had previously served as Deputy Provost for Science and Technology for one year under Hockfield, and as chairman of the department of chemistry at Yale.

On 3 June 2008, Oxford University announced Hamilton's nomination for the post of Vice-Chancellor.  On 16 June, it was confirmed that he would succeed John Hood and assume the post for a period of seven years on 1 October 2009. He is an Honorary Fellow of Harris Manchester College and Wolfson College at Oxford.

President of New York University
On 18 March 2015, New York University announced Hamilton's appointment to begin as the 16th President of the university. His duties began in January 2016. In his first year, the university paid him $1.8 million. On 13 April 2022, Hamilton announced his intention to step down as President of the university after the 2022-2023 semester.

Personal life
Hamilton lives in a university-provided penthouse in Greenwich Village with his wife Jennifer. He has three children.

References

Further reading

External links
Office of the Provost (Yale)
Vice-Chancellor's Office (Oxford)
Hamilton Research Group (Oxford)

1952 births
Living people
Alumni of St John's College, Cambridge
Alumni of the University of Exeter
English chemists
Fellows of the Royal Society
People educated at Royal Grammar School, Guildford
University of British Columbia alumni
Vice-Chancellors of the University of Oxford
Yale University faculty
Presidents of New York University